Storytellers (established 1992 in Trondheim, Norway) is a Norwegian experimental Jazz band exploring the interface between music and lyrics.

Storytellers released the album Enjoy Storytellers in 1994.

Band members
Eivind Aakhus (composer, lyricist)
Nils-Olav Johansen (guitar)
Svein Folkvord (composer, double bass)
Sverre Gjørvad (composer, drums)

Discography
Enjoy Storytellers! – (1994, Curling Legs)

References

Norwegian jazz composers
Norwegian jazz ensembles
Norwegian experimental musical groups
Musical groups established in 1992
Musical groups from Oslo